Bill Smith (born 23 December 1938) is a Scottish former footballer who played in the Scottish Football League for Raith Rovers and in the English Football League for Darlington in the 1960s. An inside forward, he also played in Scotland for Banks O' Dee and Nairn County.

References

1938 births
Living people
Footballers from Aberdeen
Scottish footballers
Association football inside forwards
Banks O' Dee F.C. players
Raith Rovers F.C. players
Darlington F.C. players
Nairn County F.C. players
Scottish Football League players
English Football League players